Traders Point Hunt Rural Historic District is a national historic district located at Eagle Township, Boone County, Indiana.  The district encompasses 34 contributing buildings, 18 contributing sites, and 7 contributing structures in a rural area near Zionsville.  The district is characterized by the agricultural landscape, farmsteads and estates, recreational landscapes, transportation features including roads and bridges, and historic cemeteries.

It was listed on the National Register of Historic Places in 2009.

References

Historic districts on the National Register of Historic Places in Indiana
Greek Revival architecture in Indiana
Geography of Boone County, Indiana
Historic districts in Boone County, Indiana
National Register of Historic Places in Boone County, Indiana